Alvinópolis is a Brazilian municipality in the state of Minas Gerais.  its population is estimated to be 15,169. The city belongs to the mesoregion Metropolitana de Belo Horizonte and to the microregion of Itabira.

See also
 List of municipalities in Minas Gerais

References

Municipalities in Minas Gerais